Jakhal Mandi is a city and a municipal council, near Fatehabad town in Fatehabad district in the Indian state of Haryana.

Demographics
 India census, Jakhal mandi had a population of 6890. Males constitute 54% of the population and females 46%. Jakhal Mandi has an average literacy rate of 71%, higher than the national average  of 59.5%: male literacy is 76%, and female literacy is 67%. In Jakhal Mandi, 13% of the population is under 6 years of age. Punjabi is the major language of Jakhal Mandi.

Transportation
Jakhal railway station is an important railway junction on the Delhi–Fazilka line. It is connected directly to national capital Delhi and provides connectivity to important towns of Punjab & Haryana like Ludhiana, Bhatinda & Sirsa.

Agriculture & commerce
As the name suggests - word "Mandi", which is attached with the name of town, means "Market". This town hosts a locally significant market for agricultural produce. Having direct rail connections with major economically important locations like Ludhiana, Bhatinda, Rohtak and Delhi, makes this market an important one in the region.

References

Cities and towns in Fatehabad district